The 1973 Holy Cross Crusaders football team was an American football team that represented the College of the Holy Cross as an independent during the 1973 NCAA Division I football season. Ed Doherty returned for his third year as head coach. The team compiled a record of 5–6.

All home games were played at Fitton Field on the Holy Cross campus in Worcester, Massachusetts.

Schedule

Statistical leaders
Statistical leaders for the 1973 Crusaders included: 
 Rushing: Steve Buchanan, 849 yards and 4 touchdowns on 183 attempts
 Passing: Peter Vaas, 1,631 yards, 135 completions and 13 touchdowns on 258 attempts
 Receiving: Mark Sheridan, 703 yards and 5 touchdowns on 46 receptions
 Scoring: Steve Buchanan, 42 points from 7 touchdowns
 Total offense: Peter Vaas, 1,667 yards (1,631 passing, 36 rushing)
 All-purpose yards: Steve Buchanan, 1,023 yards (849 rushing, 174 receiving)
 Interceptions: John Provost, 8 interceptions for 138 yards

References

Holy Cross
Holy Cross Crusaders football seasons
Holy Cross Crusaders football